The 22nd PMPC Star Awards for TV ceremony was held at the SMX Convention Center, SM Mall of Asia, Pasay on November 30, 2008 and broadcast over TV5 on December 2, 2008. The ceremony was hosted by Paolo Bediones, Gabby Concepcion, Anne Curtis and Judy Ann Santos and directed by Al Quinn.

Nominees and winners 
These are the nominations for the 22nd Star Awards for Television. The winners are in bold.

Best TV station 
ABS-CBN-2
NBN-4
ABC-5
GMA-7
RPN-9
Q-11
IBC-13
Studio 23
UNTV-37

Best Primetime TV Series 
Lobo (ABS-CBN 2)
Impostora (GMA 7)
Joaquin Bordado (GMA 7)
La Vendetta (GMA 7)
Ysabella (ABS-CBN 2)

Best Daytime Drama Series 
Kaputol ng Isang Awit (GMA 7)
Maging Akin Ka Lamang (GMA 7)
My Only Love (GMA 7)
Prinsesa ng Banyera (ABS-CBN 2)

Best Drama Actor 
John Lloyd Cruz (Maging Sino Ka Man: Ang Pagbabalik / ABS-CBN 2)
Tirso Cruz III (Kaputol Ng Isang Awit / GMA 7)
Ryan Eigenmann (Lobo / ABS-CBN 2)
Mark Anthony Fernandez (Impostora / GMA 7),
Sam Milby (Maging Sino Ka Man: Ang Pagbabalik / ABS-CBN 2)
Robin Padilla (Joaquin Bordado / GMA 7)
Piolo Pascual (Lobo / ABS-CBN 2)

Best Drama Actress 
Dina Bonnevie (Babangon Ako’t Dudurugin Kita / GMA 7)
Sunshine Dizon (Impostora / GMA 7)
Angel Locsin (Lobo / ABS-CBN 2)
Lovi Poe (Kaputol Ng Isang Awit / GMA 7)
Coney Reyes (Ysabella / ABS-CBN 2)
Judy Ann Santos (Ysabella / ABS-CBN 2)

Best Drama Anthology 
Maalaala Mo Kaya (ABS-CBN 2)
Magpakailanman (GMA 7)
Maynila (GMA 7)
Your Song (ABS-CBN 2)

Best Single Performance by an Actress 
Helen Gamboa (Maalaala Mo Kaya: Mesa / ABS-CBN 2)
Angel Locsin (Maalaala Mo Kaya: Pilat / ABS-CBN 2)
Shaina Magdayao (Maalaala Mo Kaya: Telebisyon / ABS-CBN 2)
Cherry Pie Picache (Maalaala Mo Kaya: Tren / ABS-CBN 2)
Susan Roces (Maalaala Mo Kaya: Basura / ABS-CBN 2)
Gloria Romero (Maalaala Mo Kaya: Singsing / ABS-CBN 2)

Best Single Performance by an Actor 
Gabby Concepcion (Maalaala Mo Kaya: Taxi / ABS-CBN 2)
Joshua Dionisio (Maalaala Mo Kaya: Sako / ABS-CBN 2)
Dolphy (Maalaala Mo Kaya: Bisikleta / ABS-CBN 2)
Eddie Garcia (Maalaala Mo Kaya: Singsing / ABS-CBN 2)
John Wayne Sace (Maalaala Mo Kaya: Mesa / ABS-CBN 2)
Gary Valenciano (Maalaala Mo Kaya: Bag / ABS-CBN 2)

Best New Male TV Personality 
Jon Avila (Komiks Presents: Kapitan Boom / ABS-CBN 2)
Robi Domingo (ASAP ‘08 / ABS-CBN 2)
Josef Elizalde (ASAP ‘08 / ABS-CBN 2)
Hayden Kho (SOP Rules / GMA 7)
Bruce Quebral (Your Song Presents: One More Chance / ABS-CBN 2)
Ferdz Recio (Born to Be Wild / GMA 7)

Best New Female TV Personality 
Marianna del Rio (Komiks Presents: Kapitan Boom / ABS-CBN 2)
Maricris Garcia (SOP Rules / GMA 7)
Patricia Gayod (Maalaala Mo Kaya: Dagat / ABS-CBN 2)
Daiana Menezes (Eat Bulaga! / GMA 7)
Kylie Padilla (Joaquin Bordado / GMA 7)
Nicole Uysiuseng (ASAP ‘08 / ABS-CBN 2)

Best Gag Show 
Bubble Gang (GMA 7)
Goin' Bulilit (ABS-CBN 2)
Nuts Entertainment (GMA 7)

Best Comedy Show 
Ful Haus (GMA 7)
John en Shirley (ABS-CBN 2)
That's My Doc (ABS-CBN 2)

Best Comedy Actor 
Ogie Alcasid (Bubble Gang / GMA 7)
Joey De Leon (Nuts Entertainment / GMA 7)
Roderick Paulate (That’s My Doc / ABS-CBN 2)
Vic Sotto (Ful Haus / GMA 7)
Michael V. (Bubble Gang / GMA 7)
Redford White (Kokey / ABS-CBN 2)

Best Comedy Actress 
Ai-Ai delas Alas (Komiks Presents: Volta / ABS-CBN 2)
Pokwang (That’s My Doc / ABS-CBN 2)
Rufa Mae Quinto (Bubble Gang / GMA 7)
Susan Roces (John en Shirley / ABS-CBN 2)
Sharlene San Pedro (Goin’ Bulilit / ABS-CBN 2)
Maricel Soriano (John en Shirley / ABS-CBN 2)
Nova Villa (That’s My Doc / ABS-CBN 2)

Best Musical Variety Show 
ASAP '08 (ABS-CBN 2)
SOP Rules (GMA 7)
Walang Tulugan with the Master Showman (GMA 7)

Best Variety Show 
Eat Bulaga! (GMA 7)
Wowowee (ABS-CBN 2)

Best Female TV Host 
Valerie Concepcion (Wowowee / ABS-CBN 2)
Toni Gonzaga (ASAP '08 / ABS-CBN 2)
Pia Guanio (Eat Bulaga! / GMA 7)
Pokwang (Wowowee / ABS-CBN 2)
Regine Velasquez (SOP Rules / GMA 7)

Best Male TV Host 
Ogie Alcasid (SOP Rules /GMA 7)
German Moreno (Walang Tulugan with the Master Showman / GMA 7)
Martin Nievera (ASAP '08 / ABS-CBN 2)
Willie Revillame (Wowowee / ABS-CBN 2)
Vic Sotto (Eat Bulaga! / GMA 7)

Best Public Service Program 
Bitag (UNTV 37)
Emergency (GMA 7)
Imbestigador (GMA 7)
S.O.C.O. (Scene of the Crime Operatives) (ABS-CBN 2)
Wish Ko Lang (GMA 7)
XXX: Exklusibong, Explosibong, Exposé (ABS-CBN 2)

Best Public Service Program Host 
Julius Babao, Karen Davila, and Henry Omaga-Diaz (XXX: Exklusibong, Explosibong, Exposé / ABS-CBN 2)
Mike Enriquez (Imbestigador / GMA 7)
Vicky Morales (Wish Ko Lang / GMA 7)
Jessica Soho (Reunions / Q 11)
Ben Tulfo (Bitag / UNTV 37)

Best Horror-Fantasy Program 
E.S.P. (GMA 7)
Komiks Presents: Kapitan Boom (ABS-CBN 2)
Super Inggo 1.5: Ang Bagong Bangis (ABS-CBN 2)
Tasya Fantasya (GMA 7)
Volta (ABS-CBN 2)

Best Reality Competition Program 
The Debutante (Q 11)
Del Monte Fit 'n Right Got 2B Fit Challenge (ABS-CBN 2)
Gandang Ricky Reyes: Parlor Game (Q 11)
Hired! (Q 11)
Kung Ako Ikaw (GMA 7)
Pinoy Records (GMA 7)

Best Reality Competition Program Host 
Paolo Abrera and Mariz Umali (Hired! / Q 11)
Keempee de Leon and Joey Marquez (Kung Ako Ikaw / GMA 7)
Marc Nelson (The Debutante / Q 11)
Manny Pacquiao and Chris Tiu (Pinoy Records / GMA 7)
Ricky Reyes (Gandang Ricky Reyes: Parlor Game / Q 11)
Mariel Rodriguez (Del Monte Fit 'n Right Got 2B Fit Challenge / ABS-CBN 2)

Best Game Show 
All Star K!: The P1 Million Videoke Challenge (GMA 7)
GoBingo (GMA 7)
Pilipinas, Game KNB? (ABS-CBN 2)
Tok! Tok! Tok! Isang Milyon Pasok! (GMA 7)

Best Game Show Host 
Paolo Bediones (Tok! Tok! Tok! Isang Milyon Pasok! / GMA 7)
Arnel Ignacio (GoBingo / GMA 7)
Jaya and Allan K. (All-Star K: The P1 Million Videoke Challenge / GMA 7)
Edu Manzano (Pilipinas, Game KNB? / ABS-CBN 2)

Best Talent Search Program 
Coca-Cola Ride to Fame: Yes to Your Dreams! (GMA 7)
Move: The Search for Billy Crawford's Pinoy Dancers (GMA 7)
Shall We Dance? (ABC 5)
U Can Dance: Version 2 (ABS-CBN 2)

Best Talent Search Program Host 
Drew Arellano and Karel Marquez (Coca-Cola Ride to Fame: Yes to Your Dreams! / GMA 7)
Billy Crawford (Move: The Search for Billy Crawford's Pinoy Dancers / GMA 7)
Arnel Ignacio, Dominic Ochoa and Lucy Torres-Gomez (Shall We Dance? / ABC 5)
Derek Ramsay and Iya Villania (U Can Dance: Version 2 / ABS-CBN 2)

Best Youth Oriented Program 
Boys Nxt Door (GMA 7)
Gokada Go! (ABS-CBN 2)
Star Magic Presents: Abt Ur Luv, Ur Lyf 2 (ABS-CBN 2)
Star Magic Presents: Astigs (ABS-CBN 2)

Best Educational Program 
Born to Be Wild (GMA 7)
Busog Lusog (ABS-CBN 2)
Chef To Go (Q 11)
Kabuhayang Swak na Swak (ABS-CBN 2)
Ka-Toque (Q 11)
Matanglawin (ABS-CBN 2)

Best Educational Program Host 
Kim Atienza (Matanglawin / ABS-CBN 2)
Christine Bersola-Babao and Ruben Gonzaga (Busog Lusog / ABS-CBN 2)
Jeramiah Favia, Luis Rey Logarta, Darl Christian Lopez, Mariemiel Sison, and Jonah Sebastian Trinidad (Ka-Toque / Q 11)
Romi Garduce and Ferdz Recio (Born to Be Wild / GMA 7)
Uma Khouny and Amy Perez (Kabuhayang Swak na Swak / ABS-CBN 2)
Rob Pengson (Chef To Go / Q 11)

Best Celebrity Talk Show 
Boy and Kris (ABS-CBN 2)
Moms (Q 11)
Sharon (ABS-CBN 2)
Sis (GMA 7)
The Sweet Life (Q 11)

Best Celebrity Talk Show Host 
Boy Abunda and Kris Aquino (Boy and Kris / ABS-CBN 2)
Gelli de Belen, Janice de Belen, and Carmina Villaroel (Sis / GMA 7)
Lani Mercado, Manilyn Reynes and Sherilyn Reyes (Moms / Q 11)
Wilma Doesnt and Lucy Torres-Gomez (The Sweet Life / Q 11)
Jaya (One Proud Mama / Q 11)

Best Documentary Program 
The Correspondents (ABS-CBN 2)
i-Witness (GMA 7)
Probe (ABS-CBN 2)
Reporter's Notebook (GMA 7)

Best Documentary Program Host 
Sandra Aguinaldo, Kara David, Howie Severino and Jay Taruc (i-Witness / GMA 7)
Robert Alejandro, Adrian Ayalin, Che Che Lazaro, Hera Sanchez, Akiko Thomson and Pinky Webb (Probe / ABS-CBN 2)
Karen Davila, Abner Mercado, Ces Oreña-Drilon and Bernadette Sembrano (The Correspondents / ABS-CBN 2)
Jiggy Manicad and Maki Pulido (Reporter's Notebook / GMA 7)

Best Documentary Special 
Harapan: The Jun Lozada Expose (ABS-CBN 2)
Koneksiyon: Anatomy of a Political Scandal (GMA 7)
Runaways: Human Trafficking Sa Jordan (ABS-CBN 2)
Signos: Ang Banta ng Nagbabagong Klima (GMA 7)
Sisid: Underwater Special (GMA 7)

Best Magazine Show 
100% Pinoy (GMA 7)
Kapuso Mo, Jessica Soho (GMA 7)
Mel and Joey (GMA 7)
Proudly Filipina (Q 11)
Rated K (ABS-CBN 2)

Best Magazine Show Host 
Joey de Leon and Mel Tiangco (Mel and Joey / GMA 7)
Charlene Gonzalez (Proudly Filipina / Q 11)
Miriam Quiambao and Joaquin Valdez (100% Pinoy / GMA 7)
Korina Sanchez (Rated K / ABS-CBN 2)
Jessica Soho (Kapuso Mo, Jessica Soho / GMA 7)

Best News Program 
24 Oras (GMA 7)
Bandila (ABS-CBN 2)
Balitanghali (Q 11)
Saksi (GMA 7)
TV Patrol World (ABS-CBN 2)

Best Male Newscaster 
Martin Andanar (Sentro / ABC 5)
Julius Babao (TV Patrol World / ABS-CBN 2)
Arnold Clavio (Saksi / GMA 7)
Mike Enriquez (24 Oras / GMA 7)
Ted Failon (TV Patrol World / ABS-CBN 2)
Alex Santos (TV Patrol Sabado / ABS-CBN 2)

Best Female Newscaster 
Karen Davila (TV Patrol World / ABS-CBN 2)
Precious Hipolito (IBC Express Balita / IBC 13)
Vicky Morales (Saksi / GMA 7)
Ces Oreña-Drilon (Bandila / ABS-CBN 2)
Korina Sanchez (Bandila / ABS-CBN 2)
Mel Tiangco (24 Oras / GMA 7)

Best Morning Show 
Good Morning Kuya (UNTV 37)
One Morning (NBN 4)
Umagang Kay Ganda (ABS-CBN 2)
Unang Hirit (GMA 7)

Best Morning Show Host 
Love Añover, Drew Arellano, Arnold Clavio, Lyn Ching-Pascual, Susie Entrata-Abrera, Jolina Magdangal, Winnie Monsod, Oscar Orbos, Eagle Riggs, Lhar Santiago, Rhea Santos and Regine Tolentino (Unang Hirit / GMA 7)
Tony Arevalo, Chris dela Cruz, Allan Encarnacion, Aida Gonzales, Janice Gotardo, Rene Jose, Lola Sela, Krist Melecio, Sahlee Piamonte, Ryan Ramos and Daniel Razon (Good Morning Kuya / UNTV 37)
Kim Atienza, Winnie Cordero, Ogie Diaz, Edu Manzano, Rica Peralejo, Donita Rose, *Alex Santos, Bernadette Sembrano, Anthony Taberna and Pinky Webb (Umagang Kay Ganda / ABS-CBN 2)
Aljo Bendijo, Nikki Jimenez, Chal Lontoc, Claudine Trillo, and Bobby Yan (One Morning / NBN 4)

Best Public Affairs Program 
Hot Seat (Q 11)
Review Philippines (Q 11)
Up Close and Personal (IBC 13)
Y Speak (Studio 23)

Best Public Affairs Program Host 
Atom Araullo and Bianca Gonzalez (Y Speak / Studio 23)
Marissa del Mar (Up Close and Personal / IBC 13)
Mike Enriquez (Review Philippines / Q 11)
Jessica Soho (Hot Seat / Q 11)

Best Showbiz Oriented Talk Show 
The Buzz (ABS-CBN 2)
Chika Mo, Chika Ko (UNTV 37)
Entertainment Live (ABS-CBN 2)
The Ricky Lo Exclusives (Q 11)
Showbiz Central (GMA 7)
Startalk (GMA 7)

Best Male Showbiz Oriented Talk Show Host 
Boy Abunda (The Buzz / ABS-CBN 2)
Raymond Gutierrez (Showbiz Central / GMA 7)
Ricky Lo (The Ricky Lo Exclusives / Q 11)
Luis Manzano (Entertainment Live / ABS-CBN 2)

Best Female Showbiz Oriented Talk Show Host 
Cristy Fermin (The Buzz / ABS-CBN 2)
Toni Gonzaga (Entertainment Live / ABS-CBN 2)
Pia Guanio (Showbiz Central / GMA 7)
Rufa Mae Quinto (Showbiz Central / GMA 7)
Ruffa Gutierrez (The Buzz / ABS-CBN 2)
Lolit Solis (Startalk / GMA 7)

Best Children Show 
5 and a Half (Studio 23)
Art Angel (GMA 7)
Kids on Q (Q 11)
KNC: Kawan Ng Cordero (UNTV 37)
Sineskwela (Studio 23)

Best Children Show Host 
Renford Alano, Aria Cariño, Isabella Dayto, Romina De Jesus, Mikee De Vega, Tonipet Gaba, Caleb Gotico, Ella Guevarra, Eugene Herrera, David Hubalde, Nikki Liu, Sam Turingan (Kids On Q / Q 11)
Pia Arcangel, Tonipet Gaba, and Krystal Reyes (Art Angel / GMA 7)
Roselle Aquino, Eric Cabobos, Cedie Caisip, Joshua Dapun, Anjene Manalang, JR Melecio, Maysie Mirani, JP Ramirez and Mikee Samson (KNC: Kawan Ng Cordero / UNTV 37)
Tado Jimenez, Shiela May Junsay and Bombi Plata (Sineskwela / Studio 23)
Brisbane, Chacha Cañete, Rafael John Tanagon, Rhea Jane Tanagon and Russ John Tanagon (5 and a Half / Studio 23)

Best Travel Show 
Balikbayan (Q 11)
Pinoy Meets World (GMA 7)
Trip na Trip (ABS-CBN 2)
Travel Time (Studio 23)
WOW: What’s On Weekend (Studio 23)

Best Travel Show Host 
Drew Arellano (Balikbayan / Q 11)
Susan Calo-Medina and Lui Villaruz (Travel Time / Studio 23)
Katherine de Castro, Jayson Gainza, Franzen Fajardo, Kian Kazemi and Uma Khouny (Trip na Trip / ABS-CBN 2)
Josephine Duterte, Loida Lagunay, Joel Mendez and Josephine Sanchez (WOW: What’s On Weekend / Studio 23)
GMA News and Public Affairs Team (Pinoy Meets World / GMA 7)

Best Lifestyle Show 
Fit and Fab (Q 11)
Kay Susan Tayo (GMA 7)
Living It Up (Q 11)
Urban Zone (ABS-CBN 2)
Us Girls (Studio 23)

Best Lifestyle Show Host 
Angel Aquino, Cheska Garcia and Iya Villania (Us Girls / Studio 23)
Susan Enriquez (Kay Susan Tayo / GMA 7)
Raymond Gutierrez, Issa Litton, Sam Oh and Tim Yap (Living It Up / Q 11)
Anna Theresa Licaros and Maggie Wilson (Fit and Fab / Q 11)
Daphne Oseña-Paez (Urban Zone / ABS-CBN 2)

Special awards

Ading Fernando Lifetime Achievement Awardee 
Rosa Rosal

Excellence in Broadcasting Awardee 
Loren Legarda

Stars of the Night 
Luis Manzano (Male)
Rufa Mae Quinto (Female)

See also 
PMPC Star Awards for TV

References 

PMPC Star Awards for Television